Tadhana is a weekly drama anthology series broadcast by GMA Network which aired every Saturday. Tadhana features the life experiences of Overseas Filipino Workers (OFWs) and the risks they're taking abroad just to give their family a comfortable and convenient life. The show is hosted by Marian Rivera.

Series overview

Episodes

2017

2018

2019

2020

2021

2022

2023

References

Lists of anthology television series episodes
Lists of Philippine drama television series episodes